Gineitiškės is a village in the Vilnius district municipality, Lithuania, a suburb of Vilnius. According to the 2011 census, it had population of 1,093, up from 525 in 2001 and 109 in 1989.

References

Villages in Vilnius County
Vilnius District Municipality